Cape Carbonara (Italian: Capo Carbonara, Sardinian: Cabo Crabonaxa) is a promontory on the southeastern tip of Sardinia, Italy, which forms the eastern end of the Gulf of Cagliari. Together with the nearby Cavoli Island and Serpentara Island, it is included in the Italian National Marine Park of Capo Carbonara (Italian: Area Marina Protetta).

It is situated within the communal territory of Villasimius, c. 6 km from the town's center. The promontory has a length of some 3.5 km and a maximum width of 1.8 km.

Sights include the remains of a fortress on the western side, and the beaches Punta Molentis, Is Traias and Porto Giunco, as well as the Stagno di Notteri with a colony of pink flamingos along the Tyrrhenian Sea on the eastern side.

The promontory also has a lighthouse, run by the Italian Air Force.

External links
Capo Carbonara Protected Area official website 

Landforms of Sardinia
Headlands of Italy
Tourist attractions in Sardinia